Mhaydseh,  (محيدثة)  Bekaa Valley, Lebanon (sometimes pronounced plainly as "Al Mhaydseh","Muhaydhi") is a town in the south-eastern portion of the Bekaa, a governorate of the Republic of Lebanon. Mhaydseh is part of the Rashaya District.

History
In 1838, Eli Smith noted  it as el-Muheiditheh; a Sunni Muslim village in the Beqaa Valley.

References

Bibliography

External links
Mhaiydseh,  Localiban 

Populated places in Rashaya District